Arath De La Torre Balmaceda (born 20 March, 1975) is a Mexican actor and comedian, best known for his roles in the telenovelas Soñadoras, Amigas y rivales, and Una familia con suerte.

Career
At the age of 17 he moved from Cancún to Mexico City in order to study at the Centro de Educación Artística (CEA). In 1996 he made his debut in the telenovela Tú y yo for Televisa, one of the main broadcasters in Mexico. In 2003 he began to act in the sketch comedy show La parodia, and El Privilegio de Mandar in 2004. In 2007, he hosted La Hora de la Papa alongside Galilea Montijo.

In October 2020, de la Torre participated in the Mexican version of The Masked Singer, ¿Quién es la máscara? on the second season as "Xolo", and was eliminated on the fifth episode.

Filmography

Film

Television

References

External links 
 

1975 births
Living people
Mexican male film actors
Mexican male telenovela actors
Mexican male television actors
Mexican parodists
Male actors from Quintana Roo
People from Cancún
20th-century Mexican male actors
21st-century Mexican male actors